The Liuxi River, or simply Liuxi, is a tributary of the Pearl River in China with its basin situated northeast of Guangzhou in Guangdong Province. It lies between the Beijiang River and Dongjiang River and is interrupted by the Liuxihe Dam.

References

Rivers of Guangdong